Mud Town is an extinct town in Washington County, in the U.S. state of Missouri. The GNIS classifies it as a populated place.

The community was so named on account of the often muddy condition of the original town site.

References

Ghost towns in Missouri
Former populated places in Washington County, Missouri